Adelino André Vieira de Freitas  (born 24 January 1986), known as Vieirinha, is a Portuguese professional footballer who plays as a winger or a full-back for Greek club PAOK, for which he is captain.

Ambidextrous, he started playing for Porto, but spent most of his professional career with PAOK and Wolfsburg. With the first club, for whom he appeared in over 200 competitive matches, he won the 2018–19 Super League Greece and three Greek Cups.

Vieirinha made his debut with the Portugal national team in 2013, and was part of the squads at the 2014 World Cup and Euro 2016, winning the latter tournament.

Club career

Porto

Formed in the youth ranks of local Vitória SC, Guimarães-born Vieirinha caught the interest of FC Porto and eventually finished his football grooming there. After a six-month loan at second division's F.C. Marco he joined the first team in the 2006–07 season, being given a four-year professional contract.

Vieirinha played his first official game for Porto on 11 August 2006, in the Portuguese Supercup against Vitória de Setúbal, coming on as a substitute in the 70th minute and scoring the game's last goal in the 89th, in a 3–0 final result.

Alongside teammates Diogo Valente and Paulo Machado, Vieirinha was loaned to Primeira Liga promotees Leixões S.C. for 2007–08. All proved instrumental as the Matosinhos side retained their league status at the end of the campaign.

PAOK

Vieirinha then returned to Porto, being immediately loaned to PAOK FC of Greece, which had expressed interest in the player as his compatriot Fernando Santos was at the club's helm at the time. A season-long loan was eventually arranged, as the player teamed up with compatriot Sérgio Conceição. After only a few games, he picked up a serious injury (torn ankle ligament) in a derby against Aris Thessaloniki FC, caused by Vitolo, a player who would join PAOK the following year.

In mid-July 2009, PAOK came to terms with Porto to make the move permanent for roughly €1 million, following Vieirinha's wish to continue playing under coach Santos. He renewed his link late in the year until June 2013, with a €15 million buyout clause.

On 4 November 2010, diminutive Vieirinha scored with his head in a 1–0 home win against Villarreal CF in the group stage of the UEFA Europa League. He was also named the Super League's most valuable player, the second individual accolade in a row whilst at the Toumba Stadium, and his team finished in third position and qualified to the Europa League.

Despite considerable transfer market speculation owing to his increased potential, Vieirinha started 2011–12 in the same place, helping the side progress to the Europa League group stage. He played 126 matches in all competitions, scoring 28 goals and making 21 assists.

Wolfsburg

With a short statement on 3 January 2012, PAOK announced the club had come to terms regarding the transfer of Vieirinha to German side VfL Wolfsburg; the player signed until June 2015, for approximately €4 million. He made his Bundesliga debut on the 21st, playing 45 minutes in a 1–0 home victory over 1. FC Köln.

Vieirinha scored his first official goal for the Wolves on 9 March 2013, contributing to a 5–2 away rout of SC Freiburg with a volley from outside the box. In September, during a DFB-Pokal game against VfR Aalen, he ruptured his knee ligaments, going on to be sidelined until April of the following year.

Vierinha played at right-back as Wolfsburg won its first domestic cup on 30 May 2015, with a 3–1 win over Borussia Dortmund, and featured in the same position on 1 August as they conquered the DFL-Supercup against FC Bayern Munich in a penalty shootout. On 8 December, again as a winger, he was one of three players on target for the hosts as they defeated Manchester United 3–2 in the last round of the UEFA Champions League's group stage and progressed at the expense of their adversary.

Return to Greece
On 31 August 2017, PAOK announced the signing of Vierinha on a €1 million fee. He scored his first goal in his second spell on 20 November, netting from a penalty in a 2–1 home win against Atromitos FC.

On 12 May 2018, a free kick from captain Vieirinha helped the club overcome AEK Athens F.C. in the final of the Greek Cup at the Olympic Stadium, a 2–0 victory to help renew the supremacy in that tournament. For his display, he was named the Player of the match.

Vieirinha suffered an anterior cruciate ligament injury against Athlitiki Enosi Larissa F.C. on 14 April 2019, going on to be sidelined for approximately six months. In spite of this, he still took the field in the 89th minute of the final league fixture with Levadiakos F.C. the following weekend, as the side were crowned champions for the first time since 1985 and third overall.

On 5 March 2021, aged 35, Vieirinha renewed his contract until the summer of 2022. On 22 May, he scored the first goal from the spot as PAOK won 2–1 against league winners Olympiacos in the domestic cup final.

On 24 February 2022, Vieirinha scored in a 2–1 home victory over FC Midtjylland in the knockout round play-offs of the UEFA Europa Conference League, helping his team reach the round of 16 in Europe for the first time in 48 years after a penalty shootout. In June, he agreed to a one-year extension.

International career

Vieirinha featured for every youth level of the Portugal national team, from under-16 to under-21, earning a total of 83 caps and scoring 28 goals in the process. In November 2011 he received his first callup to the main squad, replacing the injured Danny for the UEFA Euro 2012 playoffs against Bosnia and Herzegovina. 

Vieirinha finally made his debut for Portugal on 22 March 2013, playing the last 30 minutes in a 3–3 draw in Israel for the 2014 FIFA World Cup qualifiers. On 19 May of the following year he was named in the final 23-man squad for the finals in Brazil and, on 11 June, scored his only international goal, netting his team's fourth in a 5–1 friendly win over the Republic of Ireland in the United States four minutes after replacing Silvestre Varela. He featured once in the final stages, playing 21 minutes in the 2–1 group stage defeat of Ghana as Portugal went out on goal difference. 

On 17 November 2015, Vieirinha captained the side for the only time in a 2–0 friendly victory away to Luxembourg. At Euro 2016, under former PAOK boss Santos, he was the first choice right-back during the group stage but lost his place to Southampton's Cédric Soares in the knockout phase.

Career statistics

Club

International goals

Honours

Club
Porto
Primeira Liga: 2006–07
Supertaça Cândido de Oliveira: 2006

Wolfsburg
DFB-Pokal: 2014–15
DFL-Supercup: 2015

PAOK
Super League Greece: 2018–19
Greek Football Cup: 2017–18, 2018–19, 2020–21

International
Portugal
UEFA European Championship: 2016
UEFA European Under-17 Championship: 2003

Individual
Super League Greece Best Foreign Player: 2010–11, 2018–19
Greek Football Cup Final MVP: 2017–18
Super League Greece Team of the Year: 2017–18, 2018–19
PAOK MVP of the Season: 2010–11, 2017–18, 2018–19

Orders
 Commander of the Order of Merit

References

External links

National team data 

1986 births
Living people
Sportspeople from Guimarães
Portuguese footballers
Association football wingers
Association football utility players
Primeira Liga players
Liga Portugal 2 players
Segunda Divisão players
FC Porto B players
FC Porto players
F.C. Marco players
Leixões S.C. players
Super League Greece players
PAOK FC players
Bundesliga players
VfL Wolfsburg players
Portugal youth international footballers
Portugal under-21 international footballers
Portugal international footballers
2014 FIFA World Cup players
UEFA Euro 2016 players
UEFA European Championship-winning players
Portuguese expatriate footballers
Expatriate footballers in Greece
Expatriate footballers in Germany
Portuguese expatriate sportspeople in Greece
Portuguese expatriate sportspeople in Germany